Emperor Falls is the largest and best known waterfall on the Robson River in Mount Robson Provincial Park.  It is located a short distance downstream of and southwest from the outlet of Berg Lake.

Stature 

The falls stand 142 feet high, 5300 ft above sea level.  After dropping over the edge of the cliff the water strikes a ledge just under halfway down, this causes the formation of a roostertail which produces a large amount of spray.

Access 

To get to the falls, you hike along the Berg Lake trail for approximately 15 km, during which time you will gain about 2500 feet of elevation. A more complete description of the hike can be found in the Berg Lake article.

See also 

Mount Robson Provincial Park
Berg Lake
List of waterfalls in Canada

References

External links 

Waterfalls of British Columbia
Robson Valley
Canadian Rockies